The Night Runner is a 1957 American film noir drama film directed by Abner Biberman, produced by Albert J.Cohen and starring Ray Danton and Colleen Miller. Its screenplay was written by Gene Levitt. The story focuses on a released mental patient who falls in love but cannot control his violent urges.

Plot
Roy Turner, a mental patient with a violent past, is prematurely released from the mental ward because of overcrowding. The doctors tell him to avoid stressful situations. Realizing that he cannot handle the pressures of big-city life, he moves into a beachside motel in a small coastal town and falls in love with Susan Mayes, the daughter of the motel's owner. When her father discovers that Roy is a mental patient, he threatens to have him recommitted unless he leaves his daughter alone. Roy snaps, killing the man, and he and Susan flee down the beach. He tries to kill her by pushing her into the water but comes to his senses and rescues her. He then turns himself in.

Cast
 Ray Danton as Roy Turner
 Colleen Miller as Susan Mayes
 Merry Anders as Amy Hansen
 Willis Bouchey as Loren Mayes 
 Harry Jackson as Hank Hanson
 Roberto Anderson as Ed Wallace
 Jess Inness as Miss Dodd
 Eddy Waller as Vernon
 John Stephenson as Dr. Crawford 
 Alexander Campbell as Dr. Royce
 Natalie Masters as Miss Lowell
 Richard H. Cutting as Male Interviewer (as Richard Cutting)
 Steve Pendleton as Captain Reynolds
 Jack Lomas as Real Estate Man
 Bill Erwin as McDermott
 Alex Sharp as Deputy

See also
 List of American films of 1957

References

External links
 
 
 
 

1957 films
1957 crime drama films
American crime drama films
American black-and-white films
Film noir
Films directed by Abner Biberman
1950s English-language films
1950s American films